Sequoyah Lake or Lake Sequoyah may refer to:

 Lake Sequoyah (Mississippi)
 Sequoyah Lake (Georgia)